Georgia had a mixed at-large/district system for the 1st Congress. Representatives were elected at-large, but for three district-based seats.

See also 
 United States House of Representatives elections, 1788 and 1789
 List of United States representatives from Georgia

1789
Georgia
United States House of Representatives